Tropidonophis picturatus, the painted keelback, is a species of colubrid snake. It is found in Indonesia.

References

Tropidonophis
Reptiles of Indonesia
Reptiles described in 1837
Taxa named by Hermann Schlegel